Albert Adolph Taubert (June 15, 1900 – June 13, 1964) was a member of the United States Marine Corps who received the Navy Cross and Distinguished Service Cross for his actions during the Battle of Soissons in World War I. He was also awarded the French Military Medal for participation in the Meuse-Argonne Offensive, as well as the Italian War Merit Cross. Later, he received a second Navy Cross during the United States occupation of Haiti, during which he participated in killing the Caco leader Benoît Batraville.

Taubert was born in Madison, Wisconsin. After serving in the Marines as an enlisted man during the First World War, he served at a Marine Corps engineer training center during the Second World War.

Citations
His Distinguished Service Cross citation reads:

His first Navy Cross citation reads:

His second Navy Cross citation reads:

References

External links

1900 births
1964 deaths
Recipients of the Navy Cross (United States)
Recipients of the Distinguished Service Cross (United States)
United States Marine Corps officers
United States Marine Corps personnel of World War I
United States Marine Corps personnel of World War II
Military personnel from Madison, Wisconsin
American military personnel of the Banana Wars
Recipients of the Médaille militaire (France)
Recipients of the War Merit Cross (Italy)